Anush Begloian (born 31 July 1969, Yerevan, Soviet Armenia) is an Armenian physicist and politician of the Civil Contract. Since the Parliamentary Election in 2018, she is member of the National Assembly of Armenia.

Education 
Anush Begloian studied physics at the Yerevan State University from where she graduated in 1991 and obtained an MBA from the American University of Armenia in Yerevan in 1995.

Professional career 
Throughout her career, she was employed by various foreign and international entities such as the United States Agency for International Development (USAID), the World Bank and the United Nations High Commissioner for Refugees. She specialized in public relations and communications was the executive director of the NGO Armenian Public Relations Association between 2003 and 2009. Between 2005 and 2009 she also lectured on Business Communication and Public relations at the University of France in Armenia. In 2008 she took a hold in the private sector and was “ArmenTel” CJSC's head of public relations until 2014. In 2016 she returned as a lecturer to the University of France in Armenia.

Political career 
Before she was elected to the National Assembly of Armenia as Member of Parliament of the Civil Contract over the My Step Alliance in December 2018, she was a consultant to the Chief of Staff of the Armenian Parliament. In Parliament she is a member in the Armenian-Lithuanian and the Armenian-British Friendship Group. In November 2019 she assumed as the Vice-President of the Parliamentary Assembly of the Black Sea Economic Cooperation a post for which she was elected for one year.

Personal life 
Anush Begloian is married and has two children.

References 

Living people
1969 births
People from Yerevan
Yerevan State University alumni
Armenian physicists
21st-century Armenian women politicians
21st-century Armenian politicians
Members of the 7th convocation of the National Assembly (Armenia)
Civil Contract (Armenia) politicians